Mi Pequeña Soledad is the 12th album by Mexican singer and actress Verónica Castro, released in 1990. "Mi Pequeña Soledad" is the theme to Castro's 1990 telenovela of the same name. The album also includes the theme song for Castro's late night variety show La Movida, which aired in 1991.

Track listing
 "La Movida"  
 "Me Lo Dijo Una Gitana"
 "Corazón Herido" 
 "Me Faltas" 
 "La Musica En La Radio"  
 "Mi Pequeña Soledad" (Eduardo Magallanes)
 "Lo Mismo"
 "La Revancha De Macumba" 
 "Insignificante"  
 "Chiquita Pero Picosa" (Benjamin Sánchez Mota)

Singles

1990 albums
Verónica Castro albums